Propefusus novaehollandiae is a species of large predatory sea snail, a marine gastropod mollusc in the family Fasciolariidae, the spindle snails and tulip snails.

References

 Powell A. W. B., New Zealand Mollusca, William Collins Publishers Ltd, Auckland, New Zealand 1979 
 Vermeij G.J. & Snyder M.A. (2018). Proposed genus-level classification of large species of Fusininae (Gastropoda, Fasciolariidae). Basteria. 82(4-6): 57-82

External links

  Reeve L.A. (1847-1848). Monograph of the genus Fusus. In: Conchologia Iconica, vol. 4, pls 1-21 and unpaginated text. L. Reeve & Co., London.

novaehollandiae
Gastropods of Australia
Molluscs of the Pacific Ocean
Gastropods described in 1848
Taxa named by Lovell Augustus Reeve